Tape bias is the term for two techniques, AC bias and DC bias, that improve the fidelity of analogue tape recorders.  DC bias is the addition of direct current to the audio signal that is being recorded.  AC bias is the addition of an inaudible high-frequency signal (generally from 40 to 150 kHz) to the audio signal. Most contemporary tape recorders use AC bias.

When recording, magnetic tape  has a nonlinear response as determined by its coercivity. Without bias, this response results in poor performance, especially at low signal levels. A recording signal that generates a magnetic field strength less than the tape's coercivity cannot magnetise the tape and produces little playback signal. Bias increases the signal quality of most audio recordings significantly by pushing the signal into more linear zones of the tape's magnetic transfer function.

History 
Magnetic recording was proposed as early as 1878 by Oberlin Smith, who on 4 October 1878 filed, with the U.S. patent office, a caveat regarding the magnetic recording of sound and who published his ideas on the subject in the 8 September 1888 issue of The Electrical World as "Some possible forms of phonograph".  By 1898, Valdemar Poulsen had demonstrated a magnetic recorder and proposed magnetic tape. Fritz Pfleumer was granted a German patent for a non-magnetic "Sound recording carrier" with a magnetic coating, on 1 January 1928, but it was later overturned in favour of an earlier US patent by Joseph A. O'Neill.

DC bias 
The earliest magnetic recording systems simply applied the unadulterated (baseband) input signal to a recording head, resulting in recordings with poor low-frequency response and high distortion. Within short order, the addition of a suitable direct current to the signal, a DC bias, was found to reduce distortion by operating the tape substantially within its linear-response region.  The principal disadvantage of DC bias was that it left the tape with a net magnetization, which generated significant noise on replay because of the grain of the tape particles.  Some early DC-bias systems used a permanent magnet that was placed near the record head.  It had to be swung out of the way for replay.  DC bias was replaced by AC bias but was later re-adopted by some very low-cost cassette recorders.

AC bias 
The original patent for AC bias was filed by Wendell L. Carlson and Glenn L. Carpenter in 1921, eventually resulting in a patent in 1927. The value of AC bias was somewhat masked by the primitive state of other aspects of magnetic recording, however, and Carlson and Carpenter's achievement was largely ignored.  The first rediscovery seems to have been by Dean Wooldrige at Bell Telephone Laboratories, around 1937, but their lawyers found the original patent, and Bell simply kept silent about their rediscovery of AC bias.

Teiji Igarashi, Makoto Ishikawa, and Kenzo Nagai of Japan published a paper on AC biasing in 1938 and received a Japanese patent in 1940. Marvin Camras (USA) also rediscovered high-frequency (AC) bias independently in 1941 and received a patent in 1944.

The reduction in distortion and noise provided by AC bias was rediscovered in 1940 by Walter Weber  while working at the Reichs-Rundfunk-Gesellschaft (RRG).

Theory 

A quantitative explanation of AC bias has been given by Bertram.

See also
 Barkhausen effect
 Dither
 Hysteresis

References

Further reading

External links
 Biasing in Tape Recording

Audio storage
Tape recording

de:Tonband#Vormagnetisierung